Dickon Amiss Thomas Mitchell  is a Grenadian politician and attorney serving as the ninth prime minister of Grenada since 24 June 2022 and the leader of the National Democratic Congress (NDC) since 2021. He led his party to victory in the 2022 general election.

Early life and law career 
Mitchell was born  in Petit Esperance, Saint David, Grenada. He received an LLB (Hons) from the University of the West Indies at Cave Hill, and completed his Legal Education Certificate at Hugh Wooding Law School in 2002.

After graduation, he began as an Associate Attorney-at-Law at the firm Grant, Joseph & Co.  He founded his own firm Mitchell & Co. in 2017.

Political career 
Mitchell was elected leader of the National Democratic Congress party on 31 October 2021.

Prime Minister of Grenada 
Mitchell’s National Democratic Congress won the 2022 general election with slightly over 51% of the popular vote and winning nine out of the fifteen available seats. Mitchell reacted to the election victory by announcing that he would ask the governor-general , Dame Cécile La Grenade, to declare 24 June a national public or bank holiday so that "citizens can celebrate the liberation day and the victory that they have created for Grenada, Carriacou and Petite Martinique". On 24 June, Mitchell was sworn in as the ninth prime minister of Grenada, succeeding Keith Mitchell. He pledged to end nepotism in the Grenadian society and reform the electoral system.  He took the additional portfolio of Minister of Finance of Grenada and created a new Ministry called the Ministry of Mobilization, Implementation and Transformation. During his speech at the swearing in of Ministers ceremony, he promised to pay teachers their withheld salaries.

References

|-

|-

|-

Living people
21st-century Grenadian politicians
Finance ministers of Grenada
Prime Ministers of Grenada
21st-century Grenadian lawyers
National Democratic Congress (Grenada) politicians
People from Saint David Parish, Grenada
University of the West Indies alumni
Year of birth uncertain
1978 births